Owo is a local government area in Ondo state, Nigeria. Between 1400 and 1600 CE, it was the capital of a Yoruba city-state. The local government area has a population of 222,262 based on 2006 population census.

History

In their oral tradition, Owo traces its origins back to the ancient city of Ile-Ife, the cradle of Yoruba culture. Oral tradition also claims that the founders were the sons of the Yoruba deity Odudua, who was the first ruler of Ile-Ife. The early art-historical and archaeological records reinforce these strong affiliations with Ife culture. Owo was able to maintain virtual independence from the neighboring kingdom of Benin, but was on occasion required to give tribute. The transmission of courtly culture flowed in both directions between the Benin and the Owo kingdoms. The skill of Owo's ivory carvers was also appreciated at the court of Benin. During the seventeenth and eighteenth centuries, Benin's rulers increasingly utilized insignia made from ivory, and imported Owo's art objects and recruited its artisans for their own royal workshops.
There were other notable artworks that can be evidently supported.

Owo came under British rule in 1893. After Nigeria declared independence in 1960, it was part of the Western Region until 1967 when it became part of the Western State. Owo and its indigenes played significant roles in the politics of the first Republic in Nigeria. In 1976, it became part of the newly created Ondo State.

In June 2022, at least 50 worshippers were killed in a massacre at St. Francis Catholic Church.

The Palace of the Olowo of Owo is a cultural landmark in Nigeria, and is amongst the largest palaces in Africa.

Culture
Owo has the largest palace (Aghofen) in Africa which was declared a national monument by the federal government. Built by Olowo Rerengejen in the 14th century, the palace had as many as 100 courtyards (Ugha). Each courtyard had a specific function and was dedicated to a particular deity. The largest, said to have been twice the size of an American football field, was used for public assemblies and festivals. Some courtyards were paved with quartz pebbles or broken pottery. Pillars supporting the veranda roofs were carved with statues of the king mounted on a horse or shown with his senior wife. The most recent Olowo is Oba Ajibade Gbadegesin Ogunoye III.

Economy

The present-day city is an agricultural center involved in the growing and trade of yams, cassava, maize, okra, peppers, cocoa, and cotton.

There are, however, other meaningful commercial activities in the town, including but not limited to: timber and sawmilling, Soya bean processing plants and blockmaking industries.

The town is dotted with branches of banks including First Bank Plc, Wema Bank Plc, Polaris Bank Plc, Enterprise Bank Ltd. (formerly Omega Bank Plc), Access Bank Plc etc. The city is now witnessing a dramatic change due to expansion of its road network, particularly dualization of the main road beginning from Emure junction up to Iyere exit. A new ultra-modern market is now open in Owo.

Geography

Owo is situated in southwestern Nigeria, at the southern edge of the Yoruba Hills, and at the intersection of roads from Akure, Kabba, Benin City, and Siluko. Owo is situated halfway between the towns of Ile Ife and Benin City.

Archaeology

The Owo site was first excavated in 1969–1971 by Ekpo Eyo under the auspices of the Department of Antiquities of the Government of Nigeria. Due to Owo's location between the two famous art centers of Ife and Benin, the site reflects both artistic traditions. Important discoveries include terracotta sculptures dating from the 15th century. The Owo Museum, founded in 1968, houses many of these artifacts.

Traditional rulers
Sir Olateru Olagbegi II (1941–1968 and 1993–1998). He was dethroned in 1968 and reinstated in 1993.
Adekola Ogunoye II (February 1968 – November 1992)
Folagbade Olateru Olagbegi III (1999 – April 2019)
Oba Ajibade Gbadegesin Ogunoye III (since 12 July 2019).

Gallery

See also
Federal Medical Centre

References

Bibliography
Smith, Robert Sydney (1988), Kingdoms of the Yoruba, (Madison: University of Wisconsin Press, 3rd ed.).
Weisser, Gabriele (2008), Das Königtum der Owo-Yoruba: Zwischen Mythologie und Geschichte, (Hamburg, Kovac). (The kingdom of the Owo-Yoruba: Between Mythology and History).

 
Cities in Nigeria
Cities in Yorubaland
Local Government Areas in Ondo State
Articles containing video clips